Robert Lilley may refer to:
 Robert D. Lilley (general), Confederate brigadier general during the American Civil War
 Robert D. Lilley (businessman), American businessman, president of AT&T, 1972–1976
 Bob Lilley (soccer), American soccer coach
 Bob Lilley (footballer), English footballer

See also
 Bob Lilley (disambiguation)